Events of 2019 in Ukraine.

Incumbents
President: Petro Poroshenko (2014–2019), Volodymyr Zelenskyy (2019–present)
Prime Minister: Volodymyr Groysman

Events 

 January 5 – Bartholomew I of Constantinople issues formal decree granting Orthodox Church of Ukraine independence from the Russian Orthodox Church.
31 March 2019 Ukrainian presidential election
21 July  2019 Ukrainian parliamentary election
7 September – Filmmaker Oleg Sentsov and 66 others have been released in a prisoner exchange between Ukraine and Russia.

Births

Deaths

References

 
2010s in Ukraine
Years of the 21st century in Ukraine
Ukraine
Ukraine